is a former Japanese football player. He played for Japan national team.

Club career
Hato was born in Minamiawaji on 4 May 1976. After graduating from high school, he joined Yokohama Flügels with teammate Takayuki Yoshida in 1995. He played as mainly right midfielder and his opportunities to play gradually increased from 1997. In 1998, the club won Emperor's Cup. However the club was disbanded end of 1998 season due to financial strain, he moved to Yokohama F. Marinos. He played as mainly right side-back and also center back. The club won the champions 2001 J.League Cup and 2003 J1 League. He moved to Kashiwa Reysol in April 2004. However the club was relegated to J2 League in 2005 and he moved to Omiya Ardija in 2006. He returned to Yokohama F. Marinos in 2010. He retired end of 2011 season.

National team career
On 25 April 2001, Hato debuted for Japan national team against Spain. After debut, he played as right midfielder in most matches including Confederations Cup in 2001. However his opportunity to play decreased behind Daisuke Ichikawa in 2002 and he was not elected Japan for 2002 World Cup. He played 15 games for Japan until 2002.

Club statistics

National team statistics

Honors and awards

Team honors
J.League Cup: 2001
J1 League: 2003 2004
FIFA Confederations Cup Runner-up: 2001

References

External links

 
 Japan National Football Team Database
 
 

1976 births
Living people
Association football people from Hyōgo Prefecture
Japanese footballers
Japan international footballers
J1 League players
Yokohama Flügels players
Yokohama F. Marinos players
Kashiwa Reysol players
Omiya Ardija players
2001 FIFA Confederations Cup players
Association football defenders